Marek Żukow-Karczewski (born 6 May 1961) is a Polish historian, journalist, and author who specializes in the history of Poland, especially Kraków, and in the history of architecture and environmental issues. He is a descendant of the Polish noble family Karczewski and of the Russian noble family Żukow.

Biography 
Since 1980 Marek Żukow-Karczewski studied history at the Jagiellonian University and worked to preserve monuments in Kraków. He is the co-organizer of the Obywatelski Komitet Ratowania Krakowa and served as scientific secretary from 1981 - 1994. Among other things, he dealt with the restoration of historical monuments in the Rakowicki Cemetery.
He is the author of hundreds publications and articles about the palaces, defensive castles, the former technology, the history of medicine and of old culture and tradition. His work has been published in magazines and newspapers including in alphabetic order "Aura" - Ochrona Środowiska ("Aura -
A Monthly for the Protection and Shaping of Human Environment"), "Czas Krakowski" ("Time of Kraków"), "Echo Krakowa" ("Echo of Kraków"), "Gazeta Krakowska", "Kalendarz Serca Jezusowego" ("Calendar of the Heart of Jesus"), "Kraków" - Magazyn Kulturalny ("Kraków - Cultural Magazine"), "Posłaniec Serca Jezusowego" ("Messenger of the Heart of Jesus"), "Przekrój", "Życie Literackie" ("Literary Life") and on web portals (among other: Ekologia.pl, Wolne Media). Also collaborated with Polish Television and Polish Radio in Kraków.
Since 1990 he is a member of the Polski Klub Ekologiczny. In 1991 he became a member of the Stowarzyszenie Dziennikarzy Polskich. He is also a member of the International Federation of Journalists.

Publications (selected) 

 Sprawa Raperswilska (Raperswilska affair), 1987
 Stanisław August w Petersburgu (Stanisław August in St. Petersburg), 1987
 Pojedynki w dawnej Polsce (Duels in the former Poland), 1987
 Klejnoty i insygnia koronacyjne w dawnej Polsce. Prawdy i legendy (Crown jewels and insignia in the former Poland. Truth and legend), 1987
 Wielkie pogrzeby w dawnej Polsce (Big funerals in old Poland), 1988
 Syberyjskie losy Piotra Wysockiego (Siberian fate of Piotr Wysocki), 1988
 Największe pożary w Polsce i na świecie (The largest fires in Poland and around the world), 2012
 Największe powodzie minionego wieku w Polsce i na świecie (The biggest floods in the last century in Poland and around the world), 2012
 Gra w kości - pierwsze spotkania z człowiekiem kopalnym (Bone game - the first meeting with the men fossil), 2013
 Eksperymenty i doświadczenia medyczne na zwierzętach (Medical experiments and experience on animals), 2013
 Łuk - oręż bogów i ludzi (Bow a weapon of gods and man), 2014
 Robinson na Syberii (Robinson Crusoe on Siberia), 2016

See also 
 History of Kraków
 History of Poland
 Krakow Barbican
 List of Polish people
 Polish Crown Jewels
 Russian nobility
 Szczerbiec
 Szlachta

References

External links 

 Marek Żukow-Karczewski INFONA Portal Komunikacji Naukowej / Scholarly Communications Portal
 Marek Żukow-Karczewski CeON Biblioteka Nauki / Library of Science
 Marek Żukow-Karczewski on the website Wolne Media
 Marek Żukow-Karczewski on the website Ekologia.pl

1961 births
Living people
Historians of Poland
Writers from Kraków
Journalists from Kraków
20th-century Polish historians
Polish male non-fiction writers
Nobility from Kraków
Polish publicists
Russian nobility
21st-century Polish historians